The British Rail Class 377 Electrostar is a British dual-voltage electric multiple unit passenger train (EMU) built by Bombardier Transportation on its Electrostar platform at Derby Litchurch Lane Works from 2001 to 2014.

Description

The trains work suburban services in South London, and main-line commuter services to Sussex, Surrey, Kent and the South Coast, on which they replaced 4Cig and 4Vep slam-door stock that was more than 40 years old and did not meet modern health and safety requirements. Built in the early 2000s, the units had a troubled introduction. Being fully air-conditioned, their higher power consumption compared to the trains they replaced led to major upgrades being required to the 750 V DC third-rail power supply used in the former Southern region. The collapse of Railtrack following the Hatfield accident further delayed this upgrade work, and the new stock did not enter squadron service until 2003.

Class 377s are fitted with external CCTV. There is an open area for wheelchairs or prams, and both intermediate coaches have toilets. Bodyside power doors are electrically operated, a move away from the air-powered systems of previous generation EMUs. Dual-voltage units are fitted with a Brecknell Willis high-speed pantograph, incorporating a pair of aerofoils on the pan knuckle to steady the pan head against the OLE contact wire.
The configuration of a 5-car Class 377 unit is:
 DMOC(A) – 2 motors on inner bogie, sander, auxiliary converter module
 MOSL – 2 motors on inner bogie, standard toilet (not found on 377/3s)
 PTSOL – pantograph, transformer, compressor, universal-access toilet
 MOS – 2 motors on inner bogie, standard-class interior (only found on Class 377/6 and 377/7 units)
 DMOS(B) – 2 motors on inner bogie, sander, auxiliary converter module

In the 4-car units the driving cars are composite. The first-class saloon is between the driving cab and the first set of passenger doors. 4-car units also do not contain the MOS coach.

Couplers
The Class 377 use Dellner instead of Tightlock couplings used on the Class 375s. Southern's 375s were all reclassified to Class 377/3s upon conversion. These reclassified units can still be identified by their 3-car formation. Note that Southeastern's 375s (sub-classes 375/3, 375/6, and 375/7) were also later converted from Tightlock to Dellner couplers but were not reclassified. Its sub-class 375/8 and 375/9 units were fitted with Dellner couplers, as built.

Traction current supply
All units can receive power via third-rail pick-up which provides 750 V DC. There are eight pick-up shoes per unit (twice the number of previous generation 4-car electric multiple units), and this enables them to ride smoothly over most third-rail gaps. The units in the 377/2, 377/5 and 377/7 sub-classes are dual-voltage, and are fitted with a pantograph to pick up 25 kV AC from overhead lines. On these units (and on single-voltage sub-class 377/6), the shoe mechanism is air-operated so that when powered down, or working on AC overhead lines, the shoe is raised out of the way. This is used on trains from Hemel Hempstead to Clapham Junction, which use part of the West Coast Main Line between Hemel Hempstead and Willesden Junction, and then the West London Line towards Clapham Junction. These trains change to third-rail DC supply on a dual-voltage section of the West London line north of Shepherd's Bush. Since March 2009, dual-voltage Class 377 units operated some Thameslink Bedford to Brighton, Rochester and Ashford services (see below). The Bedford to Brighton services are now run by Class 700s, while the Class 377/5s themselves are now operated by Southeastern. 

Among the remaining units, the trailer coach in each unit has a recess in its roof where a pantograph could be fitted, to allow for future conversion to overhead AC power.

Additional units and the Thameslink Programme

In April 2007, as part of the Route Utilisation Strategy for the Brighton Main Line, it was announced that Southern would procure an additional 48 Class 377 carriages to replace an identical number of  carriages (12 x 4-car units) due to be transferred to First Capital Connect. Eleven further dual-voltage units were then added to the order, making a total of 23. The units were commissioned at Southern's Selhurst depot in Croydon before being transferred to First Capital Connect's Bedford Cauldwell depot. The first of these, unit 377501, was delivered to Cauldwell depot on 27 February 2009 after making its first appearance through the Thameslink Central London core. The 377/5s operated mainly on Bedford to Brighton services but in the peaks formed part of First Capital Connect's and Southeastern's joint service to places such as Rochester and Ashford.

Delays in the construction of the Class 377/5s for First Capital Connect saw the temporary transfer of eight of Southern's Class 377/2s to FCC to enable it to implement the planned timetable changes on 22 March 2009. The loss of these units until September 2009 was covered by the temporary cascade of a number of Class 350/1s to Southern from London Midland, which operated services between East Croydon and Milton Keynes.

In September 2011, it was announced that Southern had begun the procurement of 130 vehicles, due to delays in the procurement of new Thameslink rolling stock that would prevent transfer of the 377/5s in time for the December 2013 timetable change. The contract was awarded to Bombardier in December 2011. The additional eight five-car units (from an option in the contract for 40 additional vehicles) are dual-voltage and known as Class 377/7.

In December 2011, three Class 377/2 units were transferred from Southern to First Capital Connect to allow more 12-car services to operate.

During mid-2013, the first of the new Class 377/6s arrived from Derby for type testing, and since October 2013, these units have been used in passenger service, initially in peak-hour services on the Sutton and Mole Valley lines, Epsom Downs Branch, Tattenham Corner Line and the Caterham Line.

Southeastern received 25 Class 377 units (the 23 Class 377/5s and 2 Class 377/1s) in recent years, as specified in Department for Transport documents, published in September 2013, relating to the new combined Thameslink, Southern and Great Northern Franchise.

Refurbishment
Porterbrook is funding the £55 million five-year Project Aurora programme to refurbish 214 Class 377 Electrostars operated on Southern services. The work started in 2020 and is being done at Selhurst depot. 377 430 was the first unit to be completed in early 2021. Changes include the installation of screens showing live GTR and London Underground service information, the provision of USB and power points, energy-saving LED lighting and a passenger-counting system which will enable GTR to analyse how busy individual services are.

Current operations

Southern 
 Mainline and Redhill Routes: London to Brighton, Horsham, Reigate, Tonbridge, Eastbourne, Ore, Portsmouth, Southampton, Littlehampton and Bognor Regis
 East Coastway: Brighton to Eastbourne, Hastings, Ore and selected workings along the Seaford branch line
 West Coastway: Brighton to Portsmouth, Littlehampton, Bognor Regis and Southampton (selected workings)
 West London Route: Clapham Junction to Watford Junction
 Oxted Line: London to East Grinstead
 Outer Suburban services: Central London to Tattenham Corner, Epsom, Horsham, Dorking, Guildford
 Inner Suburban services: Central London to Caterham, Sutton, Epsom Downs, West Croydon, Beckenham Junction via Crystal Palace

Southeastern
In December 2016 Southeastern (Govia) received 8 units (377501-377508), transferred from Thameslink. In September 2017 these were joined by an additional 17 units (377509-523 & 377163/164)

Aborted proposals

Great Northern
In 2016, 19 of the 23 Class 377/5 units were planned to be transferred to Great Northern, for use on non-stop London-Cambridge services. However, the 29 former Thameslink Class 387/1s were transferred, instead. The Class 377/5s were later transferred to Southeastern, as part of their requirement for additional capacity.

Fleet details

Accidents and incidents
On 28 November 2016, a fire broke out in the MOSL car of a Southern Class 377 (unit 377442) at Eastbourne station, causing damage to the ceiling and interior. The cause was later identified to be faulty wiring within a hand dryer located in the toilet.

On 17 February 2018,  a 377 (unit 377454) hit a car on a level crossing at Barns Green near . The two occupants of the car died at the scene.

On 8 May 2019, 377142 collided with the buffer stop at London Victoria station.

On 23 August 2020, 377317 was derailed at the exit of the Tonbridge Jubilee Sidings.

References

External links

Bombardier Transportation multiple units
377
Train-related introductions in 2003
750 V DC multiple units
25 kV AC multiple units